India's Citizen Squad is a military reality show telecasted by Discovery Channel (Indian TV channel) and uploaded to Veer by Discovery YouTube channel. It features 12 Indian citizens to go under training with camp commander Col. Manish Sarin, a veteran from the Gorkha Rifles along with five ex-special forces soldiers from the MARCOS, NSG and the Para SF.

List of contestants 
1. Nilay Sharma from Bengaluru

2. Muntazir Ahmad from Srinagar

3. Ashish Tamang from Darjeeling

4. Sonu Kumar from Muzaffarnagar

5. Sunil Singh from Mumbai

6. Rohit Singh Bhandari from Haldwani

7. Tanushree Chakrabarti from Delhi

8. Himanshu Bishnoi from Hisar

9. Pallavi Vengurlekar from Delhi

10. Sunny Sehrawat from Delhi

11. Rishab Singh from Delhi

12. Manav Singh Dhillon from Delhi

Awards 
The show won the following awards at the 15th edition of the Indian Telly Awards

1. Best Reality Show (won)

2. Best Indian Original Format (Non Fiction/Reality) (won)

References

External links 

 India's Citizen Squad on Amazon Prime Video
 India's Citizen Squad on Discovery Plus
 

Indian reality television series
2018 Indian television series debuts